Otten is a Dutch and Low German patronymic surname (son of Ot, Otte, Otto). It can refer to

Andy Otten (born 1989), Australian rules footballer
Don Otten (1921–1985), American basketball player
 (1873–1931), Dutch translator
Ernie Otten (born 1954), South Dakota politician
Frans Otten (1895–1969), Dutch businessman, president of Philips from 1939 to 1961
Otten Cup, annual youth football tournament named after Frans Otten
Gerold Otten (born 1955), German politician
George H. Otten (1889–1978), American landscape architect 
Herman Otten (born 1966), South Dakota politician
Jacob Otten Husly (1738–1796), Dutch architect
Jim Otten (born 1951), American baseball player
John Otten (1870–1905), American baseball player
Jonny Otten (born 1961), German footballer
Karl Otten (1889–1963), German expressionist writer and broadcaster
Kate Otten (born 1964), South African architect
Les Otten (born 1949), American businessman
Louis Otten (1883–1946), Dutch footballer
Mac Otten (born 1925), American basketball player
Marissa Otten (born 1989), Dutch racing cyclist
Mark Otten (born 1985), Dutch footballer
Matthew Otten (born 1981), American basketball player
Max Otten (born 1992), Australian rules footballer
Ryan Otten (born 1990), American football player
Scott Otten (born 1994), Welsh rugby player
Thomas Otten, French New Age singer
Willem Jan Otten (born 1951), Dutch writer, playwright and poet

See also
Ottens
Otte
Otter (surname)

Dutch-language surnames
Low German surnames
Patronymic surnames

de:Otten
fr:Otten
nl:Otten
ru: Оттен